The following is a summary of Derry county football team's 2009 season.

Dr McKenna Cup
Derry were drawn in Section A of the 2009 Dr McKenna Cup along with Donegal, Femanagh and University of Ulster, Jordanstown (UUJ). New manager Damian Cassidy originally named a 27-man panel for the competition Dr McKenna Cup. It was a very experimental panel, including many newcomers, with only a handful of players having previous inter-county experience. A few other players were called into the panel later in the competition.

A.  Not named on initial 27-man panel, but later called up.

Group games

Section A final standings

Pos = Position; Pld = Matches played; W = Matches won; D = Matches drawn; L = Matches lost; F = Scores for; A = Goals against; SD = Score difference; Pts = Points.
2 points are awarded for a win, 1 point for a draw and 0 points for a lost. The three section winners plus best runner up went through to the semi-finals (shaded in green).

National Football League
Derry announced a 34-man panel for the 2009 National League on 22 January 2009. Many of the more experienced players were re-called for the competition, along with some new players who impressed during the McKenna Cup.

A.  Not named on initial 34-man panel, but later called up.

Derry National League line-ups:

Group games

Championship
In May 2009 manager Damian Cassidy announced a 35-man panel for 2009 Championship campaign. The Championship panel is much the same as that for the league, with a few additions and omissions.

A.  Not named on initial 35-man panel, but later called up.

Derry Championship line-ups:

Ulster Senior Football Championship

Qualifiers

Player statistics

Minor & Under-21

Under-21
The Derry Under 21 team were managed by Senior manager Damian Cassidy in 2009, and his backroom team consisted of Enda Gormley, Barry Dillon, P. Mullan, Kevin O'Neill and Martin McConnell.

The Under-21s were drawn with Donegal in the quarter-final of the 2009 Ulster Under-21 Football Championship. Donegal emerged victorious to knock Derry out of the Championship on a scoreline of 0–12 to 0–06.

Notes and references

External links
Derry GAA official website

Season Derry
Gaelic
Derry county football team seasons